Oltmannsiellopsidales is an order of green algae in the class Ulvophyceae.

References

External links

 
Chlorophyta orders